Kelly Delaine Brown Douglas is an African-American Episcopal priest, womanist theologian, and the inaugural Dean of the Episcopal Divinity School at Union Theological Seminary. She is also the Canon Theologian at the Washington National Cathedral. She has written six books, including The Black Christ (1994), Black Bodies and Black Church: A Blues Slant (2012) and Stand Your Ground: Black Bodies and the Justice of God (2015) and Resurrection Hope: A Future Where Black Lives Matter (2021). Her book Sexuality in the Black Church: A Womanist Perspective (1999) was groundbreaking for openly addressing homophobia within the black church.

Biography

Early life
Kelly Brown was raised in Dayton, Ohio. She grew up in a middle-class family, her father was a professional, and her mother stayed home to take care of her children. She attended college at Denison University in Granville, Ohio, where she pursued a Bachelor of Science degree in psychology. She was active as a student leader and served on a search committee for a new president of the university in 1976. She was elected to the Phi Beta Kappa society, and graduated summa cum laude in 1979. She later served on the Denison Alumni Council.

Graduate education and ordination
Following her college graduation, Douglas moved to New York City to attend Union Theological Seminary. She graduated with a Master of Divinity (M.Div.) in 1982. On September 1, 1983, she was ordained by Walter Dennis as an Episcopal priest at St. Margaret's Episcopal Church in the Episcopal Diocese of Southern Ohio. Women's ordination was officially approved in the Episcopal Church USA in 1976, and the first woman to be ordained in the Southern Ohio Diocese was Doris Ellen Mote. Douglas was the first black woman to be ordained in the diocese, and one of the first ten black women ordained in the Episcopal Church USA.

After earning her M.Div., Douglas stayed on to pursue a Ph.D. at Union. She completed her doctorate in Systematic Theology in 1988, studying with Professor James Cone, a pioneer in black theology.

Academic career
At the start of her academic career, Douglas found a position as Assistant Professor of Religion at Edward Waters College in Jacksonville, Florida. However, she soon accepted an offer to teach at the Howard University School of Divinity, where she was Associate Professor of Theology from 1987 to 2001.  In addition to teaching, Douglas contributed to the development of womanist theological discourse through her writings. While at Howard, she published her first two books: Black Christ, in 1993, and Sexuality and the Black Church, in 1998. Her most well known work, Sexuality and the Black Church, is considered to be the first book to openly address the issue of homophobia in the Black Church from a womanist perspective.

In 2001, Douglas left Howard to join the religion department at Goucher College, a small liberal arts college in Baltimore. As the Elizabeth Connolly Todd Distinguished Professor of Religion, and later the Susan B. Morgan Professor of Religion, she taught at Goucher for six years, and still retains professor emerita status. She continued writing and publishing, completing three additional books, as well as numerous articles and book chapters. Stand Your Ground: Black Bodies and the Justice of God was written by Douglas in response to the death of Trayvon Martin, and analyzes the "systemic failure to hold individuals accountable for racist aggression and murder."

In 2018, she became the inaugural dean for Episcopal Divinity School at Union Theological Seminary. She is the first African-American woman to head a seminary affiliated with the Episcopal Church.

Ecclesiastical ministry
For twenty years, Douglas served as an associate priest at the Holy Comforter Episcopal Church in Washington, DC. Then, in 2017, she joined the staff of the Washington National Cathedral as the Canon Theologian. In this role, she helped lead discussions on current issues with the congregation, providing theological background and interpretation. In 2015, a controversy emerged over two stained glass windows in the Cathedral that honored Andrew "Stonewall" Jackson and Robert E. Lee. Douglas was part of a task force assigned to study the issue and make recommendations on what to do with the windows. In 2017, after two years of discussions among the cathedral worshipping community, the cathedral chapter voted to remove the windows.

In 2019, Douglas preached at the consecration of Kimberly Lucas as bishop of the Episcopal Diocese of Colorado. Lucas is the first woman bishop and first African-American bishop in the diocese.

Family
Douglas is married to Lamont Douglas, and they have one son, Desmond.

Awards
In 1995, Douglas received the Grace Lyman Alumnae Award by the Women's Studies Department at Denison University. In 2000, she was awarded Denison's Alumni Citation. While teaching at Goucher College, she was awarded the Goucher College Caroline Doebler Bruckerl Award.

She is also a recipient of the Anna Julia Haywood Cooper Award, given by the Union of Black Episcopalians.

Published works
Black Christ (1993) - 
Sexuality and the Black Church (1998) - 
What's Faith Got to Do with It: Black Bodies/Christian Souls (2005) - 
Black Bodies and the Black Church: A Blues Slant (2012) - 
Stand Your Ground: Black Bodies and the Justice of God (2015) 
Black Christ, 25th Anniversary Edition (2019) -

References

External links
 Rev. Canon Kelly Brown Douglas on C-Span

20th-century African-American writers
20th-century African-American women writers
20th-century American Episcopalians
20th-century American theologians
20th-century American women writers
20th-century Anglican theologians
21st-century African-American writers
21st-century African-American women writers
21st-century American Episcopalians
21st-century American theologians
21st-century American women writers
21st-century Anglican theologians
Academics from Ohio
African-American Episcopalians
African-American theologians
African-American women academics
African-American academics
American Episcopal theologians
American women academics
Christians from Ohio
Denison University alumni
Edward Waters College faculty
Episcopal Divinity School faculty
Women Anglican clergy
Goucher College faculty and staff
Howard University faculty
Living people
Place of birth missing (living people)
Union Theological Seminary (New York City) alumni
Union Theological Seminary (New York City) faculty
Washington National Cathedral
Womanist theologians
Women Christian theologians
Women Protestant religious leaders
Writers from Dayton, Ohio
Year of birth missing (living people)